James Barton "Mickey" Vernon (April 22, 1918 – September 24, 2008) was an American Major League Baseball (MLB) first baseman who played for the Washington Senators (1939–1948, 1950–1955), Cleveland Indians (1949–1950, 1958), Boston Red Sox (1956–1957), Milwaukee Braves (1959) and Pittsburgh Pirates (1960). He also was the first manager in the history of the expansion edition of the Senators (now the Texas Rangers), serving from 1961 through May 21, 1963, and was a coach for four MLB teams between 1960 and 1982.

Vernon retired as a player in 1960 with 2,495 hits, and holds the major league record for career double plays at first base (2,044). He has the American League (AL) record for career games (2,227), putouts (19,754), assists (1,444) and total chances (21,408).

Early life
Mickey Vernon was born in Marcus Hook, Pennsylvania, and attended Villanova University, before making his major league debut on July 8, 1939. He was the father of Gay Vernon.

During World War II, he served in the United States Navy, missing the 1944 and 1945 seasons. He served with major league players Larry Doby and Billy Goodman on Ulithi in the South Pacific in 1945; both Goodman and Vernon personally inspired Doby to become a major league baseball player; Doby became the first African-American to break the baseball color line in the American League in 1947 with the Cleveland Indians.

Baseball career

Playing career
Vernon played for 14 full major league seasons (400 at bats or more) in his 20-year career. He wound up batting over .335 twice, over .300 five times, and over .290 nine times. He was a two-time American League batting champion. In , his .353 batting mark eclipsed Ted Williams' .342 by 11 points. The following year, Vernon had a career-high 20 home runs, 97 RBIs, and 14 triples. He led the AL with 33 doubles and 67 extra-base hits. He also had 294 total bases, which was second in the AL, behind Minnie Miñoso.

Over time, Vernon became one of the best-liked ballplayers, mainly through his unique personality and charismatic, but quiet, style. On September 1, 1960, after a season spent as the Pittsburgh Pirates' first-base coach, Vernon was placed on the active list when MLB rosters expanded to 40 men. He appeared in nine regular-season games as a pinch hitter for Pittsburgh, notching an RBI single and an intentional walk in his nine plate appearances to become one of only 29 players in baseball history to have appeared in a major league game in four decades. By his final game played, on September 27, 1960, he was, at 42, the oldest player in the National League by almost a year, and one of the most popular figures in the game.

He appeared in 2,409 MLB games without playing in the postseason, third most in history behind Ernie Banks and Luke Appling. Notably, on September 25, 1960, during Vernon's time on the active list, the Pirates clinched the NL pennant; but he was not on the Pirate playing roster for the 1960 World Series, resuming his full-time coaching duties. He earned a World Series ring when the Bucs triumphed in seven games over the New York Yankees.

Vernon posted a career .286 batting average with 172 home runs and 1,311 RBIs in 2,409 games. The left-hander averaged 88 RBIs a year, and had 11 seasons with 80 or more, 3 with 90 or more. He scored 1,196 runs with 137 stolen bases and a .359 on-base percentage. His career slugging percentage was .428, with a career high of .518 in 1953. He compiled 2,495 hits, with 490 doubles and 120 triples, in 8,731 at bats. He had 3,741 career total bases, with his career high coming in 1953 (315).

Satchel Paige once said, "If I had a two run lead, and the bases were loaded in the ninth inning, and Mickey Vernon was up...I'd walk him and pitch to the next hitter." Ned Garver recalled that in Vernon's finest seasons, "He'd hit the ball wherever it was pitched. He was difficult to pitch to in those seasons."

Coaching and managing

Vernon's career as a coach and manager began during his 1960 stint on the staff of his longtime friend, Pirates' skipper Danny Murtaugh.

Inheriting the name and home field of the 1901–1960 Washington franchise, now the Minnesota Twins, the expansion Senators were hastily constructed with an undercapitalized ownership, an MLB roster of castoff players, and an almost-nonexistent farm system. They were 14–26 and last in the ten-team American League when Vernon was fired on May 21, 1963. He finished with a career record of 135–227, a .373 winning percentage.

Vernon remained in the game into the 1980s as a major league coach for the Pirates (returning there for a second term in 1964), St. Louis Cardinals (1965), Montreal Expos (1977–78) and Yankees (1982). He also managed at the Triple-A and Double-A levels of the minor leagues, and served as a roving batting instructor for the Los Angeles Dodgers, Kansas City Royals and Yankees before retiring from baseball.

Death
Vernon died from a stroke at age 90, on September 24, 2008. He had resided in Media, Pennsylvania.

MLB highlights
 MLB Record: Double plays at first base (2,044)
 American League All-Star (1946, 1948, 1953–1956, 1958)
 American League batting champion (1946, 1953)
 American League leader in doubles (1946, 1953, 1954)
 American League leader in extra base hits (1954)
 American League leader in fielding average (1950-1952, 1954)
 American League top 10 in MVP voting (1946, 1953, 1954)
 American League top 10 in triples (1941, 1943, 1946, 1947, 1951–1955)

Legacy
In August 2008, he was named as one of the ten former players who began their careers before 1943 to be considered by the Veterans Committee for induction into the National Baseball Hall of Fame in 2009.

Playing in four different decades (1939–1960), Vernon ended his career with 2,237 games at first base, second to only Jake Beckley (2,377) in major league history. He led the American League in fielding percentage four times, and the majors twice.

He became one of the few first basemen to finish his career with a .990 fielding percentage, and participated in more double plays than any other.

The Mickey Vernon Museum Collection in Radnor, Pennsylvania, honors Vernon's career, military service, and friendship with Murtaugh, among other artifacts.

Vernon is interred at the Lawn Croft Cemetery in Linwood, Pennsylvania.

See also

 Baseball Hall of Fame balloting, 2009
 List of Major League Baseball career hits leaders
 List of Major League Baseball career doubles leaders
 List of Major League Baseball career triples leaders
 List of Major League Baseball career runs scored leaders
 List of Major League Baseball career runs batted in leaders
 List of Major League Baseball batting champions
 List of Major League Baseball annual doubles leaders
 List of Major League Baseball players who played in four decades
 List of Major League Baseball players to hit for the cycle
 List of St. Louis Cardinals coaches

References

Further reading

External links

Mickey Vernon at SABR (Baseball BioProject)
Interview with Mickey Vernon conducted by Eugene Murdock, February 19, 1974, in Marietta, Ohio (40 minutes)

1918 births
2008 deaths
American League All-Stars
American League batting champions
Baseball players from Pennsylvania
Boston Red Sox players
Burials at Lawn Croft Cemetery
Cleveland Indians players
Easton Browns players
Jersey City Giants players
Los Angeles Dodgers coaches
Major League Baseball first base coaches
Major League Baseball first basemen
Major League Baseball hitting coaches
Milwaukee Braves players
Montreal Expos coaches
New York Yankees coaches
New York Yankees scouts
People from Marcus Hook, Pennsylvania
People from Media, Pennsylvania
Pittsburgh Pirates coaches
Pittsburgh Pirates players
St. Louis Cardinals coaches
Sportspeople from Delaware County, Pennsylvania
Springfield Nationals players
United States Navy personnel of World War II
Villanova Wildcats baseball players
Washington Senators (1901–1960) players
Washington Senators (1961–1971) managers